Elisbet Gámez Matos (born 17 January 1997) is a Cuban swimmer. She competed in the women's 200 metre freestyle event at the 2016 Summer Olympics.

In 2019, she represented Cuba at the 2019 World Aquatics Championships held in Gwangju, South Korea. She competed in the women's 200 metre freestyle and women's 400 metre freestyle events. In the 200 metre event she did not advance to compete in the semi-finals and in the 400 metre event she did not advance to compete in the final.

She competed at the 2020 Summer Olympics.

References

External links
 

1997 births
Living people
Cuban female swimmers
Olympic swimmers of Cuba
Swimmers at the 2016 Summer Olympics
Swimmers at the 2014 Summer Youth Olympics
Swimmers at the 2015 Pan American Games
Swimmers at the 2019 Pan American Games
Pan American Games competitors for Cuba
Swimmers at the 2020 Summer Olympics
People from Baracoa
21st-century Cuban women
20th-century Cuban women
20th-century Cuban people